This is a list of Christian denominations by number of members. It is inevitably partial and generally based on claims by the denominations themselves. The numbers should therefore be considered approximate and the article an ongoing work-in-progress.

The list includes the following Christian denominations: the Catholic Church including the Eastern Catholic Churches; all the Eastern Orthodox and Oriental Orthodox churches with some recognition and their offshoots; Protestant denominations with at least 0.2 million members; all the other Christian branches with distinct theologies, such as Restorationist and Nontrinitarian denominations; the independent Catholic denominations; and the Church of the East. With an estimated 2.42 or 2.3 billion adherents in 2015, Christianity is the largest religious group in the world, and in 2020 there were about 2.6 billion adherents globally.

Christian denominational families

Christianity – 2.6 billion

Catholicism – 1.345 billion 

Catholicism is the largest branch of Christianity with 1.345 billion, and the Catholic Church is the largest among churches. Figures below are in accordance with the Annuario Pontificio, at 2019. The total figure does not include independent denominations that self-identify as Catholic, numbering some 18 million adherents.

Latin Church – 1.327 billion

Eastern Catholic Churches – 18 million
 Byzantine Rite – 8.2 million
 Ukrainian Greek Catholic Church – 5.5 million
 Melkite Greek Catholic Church – 1.6 million
 Romanian Greek Catholic Church – 0.5 million
 Ruthenian Greek Catholic Church – 0.4 million
 Hungarian Greek Catholic Church – 0.3 million
 Slovak Greek Catholic Church – 0.3 million
 Belarusian Greek Catholic Church – 0.1 million
 Italo-Albanian Catholic Church – 0.01 million
 Greek Catholic Church of Croatia and Serbia – 0.01 million
 Georgian Byzantine Catholic Church  – 0.01 million
 Albanian Greek Catholic Church – 0.01 million
 Russian Greek Catholic Church – 0.01 million
 Greek Byzantine Catholic Church – 0.006 million
 Macedonian Greek Catholic Church – 0.001 million
 Bulgarian Greek Catholic Church – 0.001 million
 East Syriac Rite – 4.9 million
 Syro-Malabar Church – 4.3 million
 Chaldean Catholic Church – 0.6 million
 West Syriac Rite – 4.1 million
 Maronite Church – 3.5 million
 Syro-Malankara Catholic Church – 0.5 million
 Syriac Catholic Church – 0.2 million
 Armenian Rite – 0.8 million
 Armenian Catholic Church – 0.8 million
 Alexandrian Rite – 0.5 million
 Coptic Catholic Church – 0.2 million
 Eritrean Catholic Church – 0.2 million
 Ethiopian Catholic Church – 0.07 million

Canonically irregular groups
 Society of Saint Pius X – 1 million

Sedevacantists
 Congregation of Mary Immaculate Queen

Independent Catholicism – 18 million 
Various denominations that self-identify as Catholic, despite not being affiliated with the Catholic Church.

 Philippine Independent Church – 6 million (in communion with the Anglican Communion)
 Chinese Patriotic Catholic Association – 5 million
 Apostolic Catholic Church – 5 million
 Traditionalist Mexican-American Catholic Church – 2 million
 Brazilian Catholic Apostolic Church – 0.56 million
 Old Catholic Church – 0.1 million (in communion with the Anglican Communion)
 Polish National Catholic Church – 0.03 million
 Palmarian Catholic Church – 0.002 million

Protestantism – 900 million–1 billion 

Protestantism is the second largest major group of Christians by number of followers. Estimates vary from 800 million to 1 billion, or between 31% and 38% of all Christians. The main reason for this wide range is the lack of a common agreement among scholars as to which denominations constitute Protestantism. For instance, most sources but not all include Anabaptism, Anglicanism, Baptists and Independent Nondenominational Christianity as part of Protestantism. Moreover, Protestant denominations altogether do not form a single structure comparable to the Catholic Church, or to a lesser extent the Eastern Orthodox communion. However, several different comparable communions exist within Protestantism, such as the World Evangelical Alliance, Anglican Communion, World Communion of Reformed Churches, World Baptist Alliance, World Methodist Council and the World Lutheran Federation. Regardless, 900 million is the most accepted figure among various authors and scholars, and thus is used in this article. Note that this 900 million figure also includes Anglicanism, as well as Anabaptists, Baptists and multiple other groups that might sometimes disavow a common "Protestant" designation, and would rather prefer to be called, simply, "Christian".

Historical Protestantism – 300–500 million 
The number of individuals who are members of historical Protestant Churches totals to 300-500 million.

Anglicanism – 110 million 
There are about 110 million Christians in Anglican tradition, mostly part of the Anglican Communion, the third-largest Christian communion in the world, with 42 members (provinces).
 Anglican Communion – 85 million
 Church of England – 25.0 million
 Church of Nigeria – 20.1 million
 Church of Uganda – 8.1 million
 Anglican Church of Kenya – 5.0 million
 Church of South India – 3.8 million
 Province of the Episcopal Church of South Sudan – 3.5 million
 Anglican Church of Australia – 3.1 million
 Anglican Church of Southern Africa – 2.3 million
 Anglican Church of Tanzania – 2.0 million
 Episcopal Church in the United States – 1.7 million
 Church of North India – 1.5 million
 Province of the Episcopal Church of Sudan – 1.1 million
 Anglican Church of Rwanda – 1.0 million
 Church of the Province of Central Africa – 0.9 million
 Anglican Church of Burundi – 0.8 million
 Church in the Province of the West Indies – 0.8 million
 Anglican Church in Aotearoa, New Zealand and Polynesia – 0.6 million
 Church of the Province of the Indian Ocean – 0.5 million
 Church of Christ in Congo–Anglican Community of Congo – 0.5 million
 Church of Pakistan – 0.5 million
 Province of the Anglican Church of the Congo - 0.5 million
 Church of Ireland – 0.4 million
 Anglican Church of Canada – 0.4 million
 Church of the Province of West Africa – 0.3 million
 Anglican Church of Melanesia – 0.2 million
 Continuing Anglican movement and independent churches – 0.4 million
 Traditional Anglican Communion – 0.4 million
 Anglican Church in North America – 0.13 million
 Reformed Evangelical Anglican Church of South Africa – 0.09 million

Baptist churches – 100 million 
The worldwide Baptist community numbers about 100 million. However, the Baptist World Alliance, the world communion of Baptist churches, self-reports only 51 million baptized believers, as Baptists do not count children as members. Therefore, the  BWA is the 9th largest Christian communion.
 Southern Baptist Convention – 13.7 million
 National Baptist Convention, USA, Inc. – 8.4 million
 Nigerian Baptist Convention – 6.5 million
 National Missionary Baptist Convention of America – 3.1 million
 National Baptist Convention of America, Inc. – 3.1 million
 Baptist Union of Uganda – 2.5 million
 Baptist Community of Congo – 2.1 million
 Baptist Convention of Tanzania – 2.0 million
 Brazilian Baptist Convention – 1.8 million
 Baptist General Convention of Texas – 1.7 million
 Progressive National Baptist Convention – 1.5 million
 Council of Baptist Churches in Northeast India – 1.3 million
 American Baptist Churches USA – 1.2 million
 Baptist Bible Fellowship International – 1.2 million
 Lott Carey Foreign Mission Convention – 1.1 million
 Baptist Community of the Congo River – 1.1 million
 National Primitive Baptist Convention of the U.S.A. – 1.0 million
 Myanmar Baptist Convention – 1.0 million
 Cooperative Baptist Fellowship – 0.8 million
 Baptist General Association of Virginia – 0.6 million
 Baptist Convention of Kenya – 0.6 million
 Nagaland Baptist Church Council – 0.6 million
 Korea Baptist Convention – 0.5 million
 Samavesam of Telugu Baptist Churches – 0.5 million
 Orissa Evangelical Baptist Crusade – 0.5 million
 National Baptist Convention (Brazil) – 0.4 million
 Baptist Convention of Malawi – 0.3 million
 Garo Baptist Convention – 0.3 million
 Convention of Philippine Baptist Churches – 0.3
 Ghana Baptist Convention – 0.3
 Union of Baptist Churches in Rwanda – 0.3 million
 Conservative Baptist Association of America – 0.2 million
 National Association of Free Will Baptists – 0.2 million
 Convention of Visayas and Mindanao of Southern Baptist Churches – 0.2 million
 Manipur Baptist Convention – 0.2 million
 Evangelical Baptist Church of the Central African Republic – 0.2 million
 Converge – 0.2 million
 Seventh Day Baptists – 0.05 million

Lutheranism – 70–90 million 

The number of adherents in the Lutheran denomination totals to 70-90 million persons (the Lutheran World Federation reports 77 million, and is the sixth largest communion), being represented in the following churches:
 Evangelical Church in Germany – 20.2 million (10.0 million United Protestants, i.e. Lutheran & Reformed; 9.9 million Lutherans; 0.3 million Reformed)
 Ethiopian Evangelical Church Mekane Yesus – 10.4 million
 Evangelical Lutheran Church in Tanzania – 7.9 million
 Church of Sweden – 5.6 million
 United Evangelical Lutheran Churches in India – 4.5 million
 Church of Denmark – 4.3 million
 Batak Christian Protestant Church – 4.0 million
 Evangelical Lutheran Church of Finland – 3.7 million
 Church of Norway – 3.5 million
 Malagasy Lutheran Church – 3.0 million
 Evangelical Lutheran Church in America – 3.0 million
 The Lutheran Church of Christ in Nigeria – 2.2 million
 Lutheran Church–Missouri Synod – 1.8 million
 Evangelical Lutheran Church of Papua New Guinea – 1.2 million
 Evangelical Lutheran Church in Namibia – 0.7 million
 Evangelical Lutheran Church in Southern Africa – 0.6 million
 Evangelical Church of the Lutheran Confession in Brazil – 0.5 million
 The Protestant Christian Church – 0.5 million
 Evangelical Lutheran Church in the Republic of Namibia – 0.4 million
 Evangelical Free Church of America – 0.4 million
 The Indonesian Christian Church – 0.3 million
 Lutheran Congregations in Mission for Christ – 0.3 million
 Evangelical Lutheran Church of Cameroon – 0.3 million
 Evangelical Church of the Augsburg Confession in Austria – 0.3 million
 Evangelical Lutheran Church in Zimbabwe – 0.3 million
 Evangelical Lutheran Church of Latvia – 0.3 million
 Christian Protestant Church in Indonesia – 0.3 million
 Wisconsin Evangelical Lutheran Synod – 0.3 million
 Church of Iceland – 0.2 million
 Simalungun Protestant Christian Church – 0.2 million
 Evangelical Lutheran Church of Brazil – 0.2 million
 Protestant Church of Augsburg Confession of Alsace and Lorraine – 0.2 million
 Evangelical Church of the Augsburg Confession in Slovakia – 0.2 million
 Evangelical-Lutheran Church in Hungary – 0.2 million
 Estonian Evangelical Lutheran Church – 0.2 million
 Laestadianism – 0.2 million

Reformed churches (Calvinism) – 60–80 million
The Reformed tradition is represented by 60-80 million people who hold membership in the following churches; the World Communion of Reformed Churches is the fourth-largest communion.
 Presbyterianism – 40 million
 Presbyterian Church of East Africa – 4.0 million
 Presbyterian Church of Nigeria – 3.8 million
 Presbyterian Church of Africa – 3.4 million
 National Presbyterian Church in Mexico – 2.8 million
 Church of Christ in Congo–Presbyterian Community of Congo – 2.5 million
 Presbyterian Church of Korea (TongHap) – 2.4 million
 Presbyterian Church in Korea (HapDong) – 2.4 million
 Presbyterian Church in Cameroon – 2.0 million
 Presbyterian Church of Cameroon – 1.8 million
 Church of Central Africa Presbyterian – 1.8 million
 Presbyterian Church in Korea (BaekSeok) – 1.5 million
 Presbyterian Church of India – 1.3 million
 Presbyterian Church (USA) – 1.2 million
 Presbyterian Church in Sudan – 1.0 million
 Presbyterian Church of Ghana - 1.0 million
 Presbyterian Church of Brazil – 0.7 million
 Evangelical Presbyterian Church, Ghana – 0.6 million
 United Church of Christ in the Philippines – 0.5 million
 Uniting Presbyterian Church in Southern Africa – 0.5 million
 United Church of Canada – 0.4 million
 Presbyterian Church in America – 0.4 million
 Presbyterian Church of Pakistan – 0.4 million
 Presbyterian Church in Korea (Koshin) – 0.4 million
 Church of Scotland – 0.3 million or 1.5 million
 Korean Presbyterian Church – 0.3 million
 Presbyterian Church in Rwanda – 0.3 million
 Uniting Church in Australia – 0.2 million
 Presbyterian Church in Taiwan – 0.2 million
 Presbyterian Church in Ireland – 0.2 million
 Continental Reformed churches – 30 million
 Church of Jesus Christ in Madagascar – 3.5 million
 Protestant Church in Indonesia – 3.1 million
 United Church in Zambia – 3.0 million
 Evangelical Church of Cameroon – 2.5 million
 Swiss Reformed Church – 2.4 million
 Christian Evangelical Church in Timor – 2.0 million
 Protestant Church in the Netherlands – 1.6 million
 Dutch Reformed Church in South Africa (NGK) – 1.1 million
 Christian Evangelical Church in Minahasa – 0.7 million
 United Church in Papua New Guinea and the Solomon Islands – 0.6 million
 Protestant Church in Western Indonesia – 0.6 million
 Evangelical Christian Church in Tanah Papua – 0.6 million
 Protestant Church of Maluku – 0.6 million
 Reformed Church in Hungary – 0.6 million
 Reformed Church in Romania – 0.6 million
 Uniting Reformed Church in Southern Africa – 0.5 million
 Toraja Church – 0.4 million
 Reformed Church of France – 0.4 million
 Lesotho Evangelical Church – 0.3 million
 Evangelical Christian Church in Halmahera – 0.3 million
 Christian Church of Sumba – 0.3 million
 Karo Batak Protestant Church – 0.3 million
 Christian Reformed Church of Nigeria – 0.3 million
 Reformed Church in Zambia – 0.3 million
 Evangelical Reformed Church in Angola – 0.2 million
 Reformed Church in America – 0.2 million
 Christian Reformed Church in North America – 0.2 million
 Kalimantan Evangelical Church – 0.2 million
 Javanese Christian Church – 0.2 million
 Indonesia Christian Church – 0.2 million
 Church of Christ in the Sudan Among the Tiv – 0.2 million
 Evangelical Church of Congo – 0.2 million
 Christian Evangelical Church of Sangihe Talaud – 0.2 million
 Central Sulawesi Christian Church – 0.2 million
 Evangelical Reformed Church in Bavaria and Northwestern Germany – 0.2 million
 Congregationalism – 5 million
 Evangelical Congregational Church in Angola – 0.9 million
 United Church of Christ – 0.7 million
 United Congregational Church of Southern Africa – 0.5 million

Methodism – 60–80 million
The Methodist movement is represented by 60–80 million people (a figure including adherents but non-members), found in denominations including the following; the World Methodist Council is the fifth largest communion.
 United Methodist Church – 12 million
 African Methodist Episcopal Church – 2.5 million
 Church of the Nazarene – 2 million
 Methodist Church Nigeria – 2 million
 The Salvation Army – 1.8 million
 Methodist Church of Southern Africa – 1.7 million
 African Methodist Episcopal Zion Church – 1.4 million
 Korean Methodist Church – 1.3 million
 United Methodist Church of Ivory Coast – 1 million
 Free Methodist Church – 0.9 million
 Christian Methodist Episcopal Church – 0.9 million
 Methodist Church Ghana – 0.8 million
 Methodist Church in India – 0.6 million
 Methodist Church in Kenya – 0.5 million
 Korean Evangelical Church of America, Korean Holiness Evangelical Church – 0.5 million
 Wesleyan Church – 0.4 million
 Methodist Church of Great Britain – 0.2 million
 Methodist Church in Brazil – 0.2 million
 Methodist Church of Fiji and Rotuma – 0.2 million
 Global Methodist Church – Just formed in May of 2022

Adventism – 22.3 million
 Seventh-day Adventist Church – 21.9 million
 Church of God (Seventh-Day) – 0.2 million
 Advent Christian Church - 0.1 million
 Seventh Day Adventist Reform Movement - 0.042 million

Restorationism – 7 million
 Churches of Christ – 5 million
 Churches of Christ in Australia - 0.05 million
 Christian churches and churches of Christ – 1.1 million
 Community of Disciples of Christ in Congo – 0.7 million
 Christian Church (Disciples of Christ) – 0.4 million

Anabaptism – 4 million
 Mennonites – 2.1 million
 Schwarzenau Brethren (German Baptists) – 1.5 million
 Amish – 0.3 million
 Hutterites – 0.05 million

Plymouth Brethren – 1 million 
The Plymouth Brethren number around 1 million members.

Hussites – 1 million 
 Moravians – 0.825 million
 Czechoslovak Hussite Church – 0.14 million
 Unity of the Brethren – 0.035 million

Quakers – 0.4 million

Modern Protestantism – 400–500 million 
The denominations listed below did not emerge from the Protestant Reformation of the 16th century or its commonly acknowledged offshoots. Instead, they are broadly linked to Pentecostalism or similar other independent evangelical and revivalistic movements that originated in the beginning of the 20th century. For this reason, several sources tend to differentiate them from Protestants and classify them together as Independents, Non-core Protestants etc. Also included in this category are the numerous, yet very similar Nondenominational churches. Nonetheless, sources eventually combine their numbers to the Protestant tally. Despite the absence of centralized control or leadership, if considered as a single cohort, this will easily be the second largest Christian tradition after Roman Catholicism. According to the Center for the Study of Global Christianity (CSGC), there are an estimated 450 million Independents world-wide, as of mid-2019.

Pentecostalism – 280 million
Those who are members of the Pentecostal denomination number around 280 million people.
 Assemblies of God – 67 million (the 7th largest communion)
 Apostolic Church – 15 million
 International Circle of Faith – 11 million
 Fangcheng Fellowship – 10 million
 China Gospel Fellowship - 10 million
 International Church of the Foursquare Gospel - 9 million
 Ethiopian Kale Heywet Church - 9 million
 Church of God in Christ - 6.5 million
 Church of God (Cleveland, Tennessee) - 6 million
 Jesus Is Lord Church Worldwide – 5 million
 Ethiopian Full Gospel Believers' Church - 4.5 million 
 International Pentecostal Holiness Church – 4 million
 Christian Congregation of Brazil – 2.8 million
 The Pentecostal Mission – 2.5 million
 True Jesus Church – 2.5 million
 The Church of Pentecost – 2.1 million
 Universal Church of the Kingdom of God – 2 million
 Apostolic Faith Mission of South Africa – 1.2 million
 Church of God of Prophecy – 1.5 million
  Association of Pentecostal Churches of Rwanda – 1 million
 God is Love Pentecostal Church – 0.8 million
 Association of Vineyard Churches – 0.3 million
 Pentecostal Church of Chile – 0.125 million

Nondenominational Christianity – 80–100 million
 Calvary Chapel – 25 million
 Christian and Missionary Alliance – 6 million
 Born Again Movement – 3 million
 Church of God (Anderson, Indiana) – 1.2 million

African initiated churches – 60 million
60 million people are members of African initiated churches.
 Zion Christian Church – 15 million
 Eternal Sacred Order of Cherubim and Seraphim – 10 million
 Kimbanguist Church – 5.5 million
 Redeemed Christian Church of God – 5 million
 Church of the Lord (Aladura) – 3.6 million
 Council of African Instituted Churches – 3 million
 Church of Christ Light of the Holy Spirit – 1.4 million
 African Church of the Holy Spirit – 0.7 million
 African Israel Church Nineveh – 0.5 million

Chinese Patriotic Christian Churches - 25 million

New Apostolic Church – 10 million
The New Apostolic Church has around 10 million members.

Local churches – 1 to 10 million

Messianic Judaism – 0.3 million
Messianic Judaism has a membership of 0.3 million people.

Eastern Protestant Christianity – 22 million 
Eastern Protestant Christianity (or Eastern Reformed Christianity) encompasses a range of heterogeneous Protestant Christian denominations that developed outside of the Occident, from the latter half of the nineteenth century and yet keeps elements of Eastern Christianity, to varying degrees. Most of these denominations came into being when existing Protestant Churches adopted reformational variants of Orthodox Christian liturgy and worship; while others are the result of reformations of Orthodox Christian beliefs and practices, inspired by the teachings of Western Protestant missionaries. Some Protestant Eastern Churches are in communion with similar Western Protestant Churches. However, Protestant Eastern Christianity within itself, does not constitute a single communion. This is due to the diverse polities, practices, liturgies and orientations of the denominations which fall under this category. 
 Ethiopian-Eritrean Evangelical Church – 16.5 million, Alexandrian Rite
 Believers Eastern Church – 3.5 million, West Syrian Rite
 Mar Thoma Syrian Church – 1 million, Syro-Antiochene Rite  (in communion with the Anglican Communion)
 Armenian Evangelical Church – 0.25 million, Armenian Rite
 St. Thomas Evangelical Church of India - 0.1 million, Syro-Antiochene Rite
 Evangelical Church of the Augsburg Confession in Slovenia - 0.02 million, Byzantine Rite 
 Evangelical Church of Romania – 0.16 million, Byzantine Rite
 Kosovo Protestant Evangelical Church – 0.15 million, Byzantine Rite

Eastern Orthodoxy – 220 million 

The best estimate of the number of Eastern Orthodox Christians is 220 million or 80% of all Orthodox Christians worldwide. Its main body consists of the various autocephalous churches along with the autonomous and other churches canonically linked to them, for the most part form a single communion, making the Eastern Orthodox Church the second largest single denomination behind the Catholic Church. In addition, there are several Eastern Orthodox splinter groups and non-universally recognized churches.

Autocephalous churches – 168 million
 Russian Orthodox Church – 100 million
 Romanian Orthodox Church – 17–18.8 million
 Church of Greece – 10 million
 Serbian Orthodox Church – 8-12 million
 Bulgarian Orthodox Church – 8-10 million
 Ecumenical Patriarchate of Constantinople – 5.25 million
 Greek Orthodox Church of Antioch – 4.3 million
 Georgian Orthodox Church – 3.5 million
 Macedonian Orthodox Church – 2 million
 Church of Cyprus – 0.7 million
 Polish Orthodox Church – 0.6 million
 Greek Orthodox Church of Alexandria – 0.5 million
 Albanian Orthodox Church – 0.4 million
 Greek Orthodox Church of Jerusalem – 0.4 million
 Czech and Slovak Orthodox Church – 0.075 million

Autonomous churches – 13 million
 Ukrainian Orthodox Church (Moscow Patriarchate) – 7.2 million
 Metropolitan Church of Chișinău and All Moldova (Moscow Patriarchate) – 3.2 million
 Russian Orthodox Church Outside Russia – 0.4 million
 Metropolitan Church of Bessarabia (Moldova) (Romanian Patriarchate) – 0.72 million
 Orthodox Ohrid Archbishopric (North Macedonia) – 0.34 million
 Estonian Orthodox Church (Moscow Patriarchate) – 0.3 million
 Finnish Orthodox Church (Ecumenical Patriarchate) – 0.06 million
 Chinese Orthodox Church (Moscow Patriarchate) – 0.03 million
 Japanese Orthodox Church (Moscow Patriarchate) – 0.03 million
 Latvian Orthodox Church (Moscow Patriarchate) – 0.02 million
 Estonian Orthodox Church (Ecumenical Patriarchate) – 0.02 million

Churches in communion with the above Orthodox Churches but with disputed autocephaly – 19 million
 Orthodox Church of Ukraine – 12–18 million
 Orthodox Church in America – 1 million

Non-universally recognized churches – 3.82 million
 Belarusian Autocephalous Orthodox Church – 2.4 million
 Orthodox Church of Greece (Holy Synod in Resistance) – 0.75 million
 Old Calendar Bulgarian Orthodox Church – 0.45 million
 Orthodox Church in Italy – 0.12 million
 Old Calendarist Romanian Orthodox Church – 0.05 million
 Montenegrin Orthodox Church – 0.05 million

Other separated Orthodox groups – 6 million

 Old Believers – 5.5 million
 Greek Old Calendarists – 0.86 million
 True Orthodox Church – 0.85 million
 Evangelical Orthodox Church – 0.07 million
 Autocephalous Turkish Orthodox Patriarchate – 0.002

Oriental Orthodoxy – 62 million

The Oriental Orthodox Churches are those descended from those that rejected the Council of Chalcedon in 451. Despite the similar name, they are therefore a different branch of Christianity from the Eastern Orthodox (see above). There are an estimated 62 million Oriental Orthodox Christians, worldwide.

Autocephalous churches – 61.7 million
 Ethiopian Orthodox Tewahedo Church – 37 million
 Coptic Orthodox Church – 10 million
 Armenian Apostolic Church – 9 million
 Mother See of Holy Etchmiadzin – 6 million
 Holy See of Cilicia – 1.5 million
 Armenian Patriarchate of Constantinople – 0.5–0.7 million
 Armenian Patriarchate of Jerusalem – 0.34 million
 Eritrean Orthodox Tewahedo Church - 2 million
 Malankara Orthodox Syrian Church - 2 million
 Syriac Orthodox Church – 1.4 million
 Jacobite Syrian Christian Church – 1.2 million

Autonomous churches – 0.01 million
 French Coptic Orthodox Church – 0.01 million

Churches not in communion – 0.07 million
 Malabar Independent Syrian Church – 0.06 million
 British Orthodox Church – 0.01 million

Non-trinitarian Restorationism – 35 million 
 
A sixth group is composed by Nontrinitarian Restorationists. These groups are quite distinct from orthodox Trinitarian restorationist groups such as the Disciples of Christ, despite some shared history.

Latter Day Saint movement (Mormonism) – 17 million
 The Church of Jesus Christ of Latter-day Saints – 16.8 million
 Community of Christ – 0.25 million

Jehovah's Witnesses – 8.7 million

Oneness Pentecostalism – 7.5 million
 United Pentecostal Church International – 5.5 million
 Pentecostal Assemblies of the World – 2 million

Minor denominations – 4.4 million
 Iglesia ni Cristo – 2.3 million
 The Unification Church (aka Moonies) – 1–2 million
 La Luz del Mundo – around million (See La Luz del Mundo#Membership statistics)
 Unitarian Universalism – 0.6 million
 Unitarian Universalist Association – 0.2 million(Unitarian Universalism developed out of Christian traditions but no longer identifies as a Christian denomination.)
 Church of Christ, Scientist – 0.4 million
 Church of Christ, 4th Watch – 0.6 million
 Friends of Man – 0.07 million
 Christadelphians - 0.05 million  
 Family International – 0.01 million

Church of the East – 0.6 million 
Divisions occurred within the church itself, but by 1830 two unified patriarchates and distinct churches remained: the Assyrian Church of the East and the Chaldean Catholic Church (an Eastern Catholic Church in communion with the Holy See). The Ancient Church of the East split from the Assyrian Church of the East in 1968. In 2017, the Chaldean Catholic Church had approximately 628,405 members, the Assyrian Church of the East 323,300, while the Ancient Church of the East had 100,000.
 Assyrian Church of the East – 0.5 million
 Ancient Church of the East – 0.1 million

See also 

 Christian state
 List of Christian denominations
 List of current Christian leaders
 List of largest church buildings
 List of schisms in Christianity 
 List of the largest Protestant denominations
 Major religious groups

References

External links 
 Yearbook of American and Canadian Churches
 National Council of Churches USA
 Pew Research Center – News Release 2002 (archived 1 November 2006)
 Pew Research Center – 2015 America's Changing Religious Landscape
 Association of Religion Data Archives

 
Christian denominations